Krasnostop Zolotovsky is an indigenous Russian grape variety that is regarded as the local grape with the best potential for red wine production. 

The name 'Krasnostop' is derived from the Russian words Krasniy (which means Red) and Stopa (which means Grape stalks), that describe the appearance of its stems. It gives wines that are typically rich in tannins, alcohol and acidity, with flavors reminiscent of dark plums, redcurrant and green pepper. Notable producers include Vedernikov Winery and Domaines Burnier, both of which produce a varietal wine from this rare grape.

See also
 Russian wine

References

Red wine grape varieties
Russian wine